Kramgoa låtar 11 is a 1983 Vikingarna studio album. The album was rereleased to CD in 1988 and 1992.

Track listing

Side A
Liljor (Give Me Flowers While I'm Living)
Med vinden kom en sång
Ord (Words)
La Paloma
Sista dansen
Klockornas sång
Memory (instrumental)

Side B
Änglahund
Save Your Love
Marie Marie
Leka med elden (Ginny Come Lately)
Indian Love Call (instrumental)
Det här är bara början
En sång till alla människor

Charts

References 

1983 albums
Vikingarna (band) albums
Swedish-language albums